Richard Sambrook is a British journalist, academic and a former BBC executive. He is Emeritus Professor in the School of Journalism, Media and Culture at  Cardiff University. For 30 years, until February 2010, he was a BBC journalist and later, a news executive.

Early life and career
Sambrook was educated at Maidstone Technical High School, at the University of Reading (BA in English) and at Birkbeck College, University of London (MSc in politics). His career began in local newspapers in South Wales.

His 30 years at the BBC was almost entirely in news. He was successively a programme editor, news editor and Head of Newsgathering when the Corporation won a number of awards for its international news coverage. He merged radio and television news, and domestic and World Service newsgathering during this time, resulting in the world's largest broadcast news operation. He was acting Director of Sport in 2000, and became Director of News in 2001.

Sambrook defended in June/July 2003 what became the highly controversial Today programme report that the Blair government had in its September Dossier knowingly exaggerated claims relating to Iraq's supposed possession of weapons of mass destruction. On 20 July, he confirmed that Dr. David Kelly had been the source of the news item. He later gave evidence to the Hutton Inquiry into Kelly's apparent suicide.

He spent ten years on the management board of the BBC becoming successively Director of BBC Sport, Director of BBC News and finally Director of the World Service and Global News in September 2004. He oversaw major restructuring of the World Service, and its opening of Arabic and Persian television, as well as commercial interactive services.

Other and subsequent roles

From 2010 until 2012, he was Global Vice Chairman and Chief Content Officer of the Edelman public relations agency. From January 2010 until 2017, he was a Visiting Research Fellow at the Reuters Institute for the Study of Journalism at the University of Oxford as well as Professor of Journalism at Cardiff University. He has published several books and research papers on journalism including on international news, the future of TV News and the role of impartiality in digital news. In 2020 the BBC commissioned him to review staff use of social media.  

He is a Director of The Bureau for Investigative Journalism and Chair of The Frontline Club – London's press club for independent journalists. He is also Chair of the DMA Media group – a media services company. 

He was a Trustee of the WWF-UK from 2012 until 2018 and of the International News Safety Institute for which he led an inquiry into the deaths of journalists around the world. From 2006 to 2009, he was Vice President of the European Broadcasting Union and represented public broadcasters on the advisory group to the UN's Internet Governance Forum. He was a member of the leadership committee of the Global Media AIDS Initiative, established by UN Secretary General Kofi Annan in 2004. He was on the advisory board of the British Council and was formerly Chairman of the BBC's international charity, the World Service Trust, and a trustee of the free-speech NGO Article 19. He is a Fellow of the Royal Television Society and of the Royal Society of Arts.

Personal life
Sambrook is married with two children.

Publications

References

External links
Are Foreign Correspondents Redundant? (Reuters Institute)
Appointed Professor of Journalism
BBC press office biography
Killing The Messenger report for INSI
The case against censorship, 2005
Interview in the Guardian
Interview by Ray Snoddy, the Independent
Columbia University Poliak Lecture , 2005
Speaking at European Journalism Centre Conference
Sambrook to review BBC's social media use

1956 births
Living people
British male journalists
Alumni of the University of Reading
Alumni of Birkbeck, University of London
BBC executives
Journalism academics
Academics of Cardiff University